Jorida Tabaku (born in Tirana, on 1 July 1979) is an Albanian liberal politician with the Democratic Party of Albania. During the Tirana mayoral leadership of current DP leader Lulzim Basha, she served as deputy-mayor in the years 2011-2015.

Education
Jorida is graduated with distinction in Business Administration from the Faculty of Economy of University of Tirana.  She has successfully completed her post graduate studies in UK and USA. Jorida received a MA in Management with Distinction from Durham University in UK and holds a Doctorate Degree in Management on Promotion of Entrepreneurship and Corporate Governance.

Career
Starting from 2002, Jorida has been a lecturer at the Faculty of Economy and co-author of the university textbook on Corporate Governance.  Jorida has been the Executive Director of SIFE Albania (Students in Free Enterprise) and was actively engaged in the civil society activities.

In 2005, immediately after finishing her graduate studies in UK, Jorida was hired as a local consultant in the DFID project on Strengthening Public Expenditure Management in Albania, implemented by REPIM, working closely with the Parliament on the budget analysis, and with Ministry of Finance and line ministries on the budget preparation and implementation process. During this period she participated in various research studies and published articles in national and international academic journals in the areas of entrepreneurship, corporate governance, financing of higher education institutions, privatisation process, public financial management, etc.

Political career
In 2009, Jorida was appointed Deputy Minister of European Integration, a position she held until mid-2011. In the Ministry of European Integration Jorida was responsible for the coordination of the EU financial support and following with priority the European integration political agenda. Under her leadership, the Ministry established the necessary structures responsible for the decentralization of the EU funds. She was particularly engaged on the EU Questionnaire and preparation of the action plan on the 12 priorities.

In 2011, Jorida chaired the list of the Municipal Advisors of Tirana for the Democratic Party of Albania, and in July 2011 she was appointed Deputy Mayor of Tirana. During the two years she worked for the Municipality of Tirana she was actively involved in drafting the Tirana Urban Plan, with particular regard on development of Tirana’s old neighbourhood still inhabited by Tirana autochthon families. As a Deputy Major, Jorida led the process of investment planning in the capital city, the Local Economic Development and Financial Management. She has intensively worked on the new fiscal package and policies promoting entrepreneurship and fostering employment, especially for the youth.

In the 2013 Albanian parliamentary election Jorida was elected Member of the Parliament of Albania in the Capital City of Tirana, representing the Democratic Party of Albania. She is a member of the Parliamentary Committees of Economy & Finance and European Integration.

During the 2017 Parliamentary election she was elected for a second mandate as MP and retained her position at the Parliamentary Committee for Economy and Finance.

Political Positions

Economy
Tabaku has been a vocal supporter of the flat tax. In 2018 she proposed that the flat tax is the only way to bring back the economy on the right track.
This suggestion made by Democrats comes after Socialists in power replaced the flat tax with a progressive tax. The flat tax was a form of taxation which had been applied by Berisha’s government during the time that the right wing was in power.

EU Integration
She is a strong supporter of Albania joining the EU.

Personal life
Jorida was born in Tirana, In 2007 she married Saimir Sallaku, with whom she has twin daughters and a son.

References

1979 births
Politicians from Tirana
Alumni of Durham University
University of Tirana alumni
Democratic Party of Albania politicians
Members of the Parliament of Albania
Women members of the Parliament of Albania
Living people
21st-century Albanian women politicians
21st-century Albanian politicians